Philister Jebet-Sang  (born 12 September 1984) is a retired Kenyan female volleyball player, who played as a wing spiker.

She was part of the Kenya women's national volleyball team. She competed at the 2002 FIVB Volleyball Women's World Championship in Germany. On club level she played with Kenya Pipeline. She also competed with the national team at the 2004 Summer Olympics in Athens, Greece. She played with Indian Hills Community College in 2004.

Clubs
 Kenya Pipeline (2002)
  Indian Hills Community College (2004)

References

1984 births
Living people
Kenyan women's volleyball players
Place of birth missing (living people)
Volleyball players at the 2004 Summer Olympics
Olympic volleyball players of Kenya